Calochone is a genus of flowering plants in the family Rubiaceae. The genus is found in Cameroon, Gabon, Cabinda Province, Republic of the Congo, and Democratic Republic of the Congo.

Species

 Calochone acuminata Keay - Cabinda, Cameroon, Gabon
 Calochone redingii (De Wild.) Keay -  Gabon, Cabinda Province, Republic of the Congo, and Democratic Republic of the Congo

References

External links
Calochone in the World Checklist of Rubiaceae

 
Rubiaceae genera
Flora of Africa
Taxonomy articles created by Polbot
Taxa named by Ronald William John Keay